The Birdman Chinook is a family of single and two-place, pusher configuration, high-wing ultralight aircraft that was first flown on 12 December 1982 and produced by Birdman Enterprises of Edmonton, Alberta, Canada, starting in 1983.

The Chinook design has evolved through several models over time, and has been produced by two companies. Over 850 in total have been completed and flown, and kits remain in production in the 21st century.

Design and development

Chinook WT-11

Design goals
The first Chinook model introduced was the single-seat WT-11, which entered the market in 1983. The WT-11 was the eleventh aircraft designed by Ukrainian-born aeronautical engineer Vladimir Talanczuk, a graduate of the Polish Institute for Aviation Specialists. The airfoil was developed by Dr Dave Marsden at the University of Alberta and is designated as the UA 80/1.

The company design goals for the WT-11 were:

Good flying characteristics
Simplicity of construction
Maximization of aesthetics

Designer Talanczuk stated his own design intentions:

The WT-11 was designed to comply with the then-new US FAR 103 Ultralight Vehicles category, including the maximum  empty weight. The  Rotax 377 engine became quickly available as an option to give the aircraft more power on floats.

In 1987, the WT-11 was redesignated as the Chinook 1S (1 Seat) by the company to align its nomenclature with the later two-seat Chinook 2S model.

Construction
This gives the WT-11 a very low span-loading as well as a light wing loading. Chinooks have been soared power-off for long duration flights.

The aircraft is constructed entirely from 6061-T6 aluminium tubing, bolted together with aircraft-grade AN hardware and covered with 3.9 oz/yd2 (132 g/m2) Dacron. The covering includes zippers to facilitate inspection. The structure was static load tested to +6/-3 g. The fuselage is built on a  central "spinal" tube that supports the cockpit and the tail surfaces. The cockpit is of a unique pentagonal cross-section that provides a very wide  cabin at hip level. The upper cockpit tubing curves down to the aircraft's nose at a ratio of 3:1 to provide a compromise between internal cockpit space and streamlining and gives the Chinook its distinctive profile.

The landing gear is of conventional configuration, with bungee suspension, giving good rough field capabilities. The enclosed cabin includes a cargo area that is located on the aircraft's center of gravity, eliminating trim changes as the load varies.

The wing is a two-spar design, supported by a "V" strut and jury struts. The wing has internal lift and drag bracing wires. The ailerons were originally designed to be "gapless", with the wing's Dacron covering extending over the ailerons. This is sometimes referred to as wing warping, but it differs from that employed on pioneer aircraft. In 1986, the company abandoned the "gapless" aileron design and moved to a more conventional separate aileron. Conversion kits for the existing aircraft fleet were made available.  The WT-11's wings are removable by two people in 15 minutes. The tail surfaces use a similar sealed-gap system, utilizing seamless transitions from the fixed fin and horizontal stabilizer to the movable rudder and elevator.

The factory claimed that construction time from the assembly kit was 100 hours for a first time builder. The price for a WT-11 in 1984 was Can$7995 (US$6395).

Test flying
Test flying the WT-11 was carried out following the first flight on 12 December 1982 at Wizard Lake, Alberta, by company chief test pilot Dennis Maland.

The stall speed was noted as 23-25 mph (37–41 km/h). Maland rated the rudder and elevators as "very responsive" and the ailerons as "less sensitive but good", with roll rates from 45 to 45 degrees of 3.5 seconds at cruise speed.

The aircraft was flown in  surface winds safely.

Extensive stall  and spin testing was carried out at Wizard Lake on 28 December 1982. Straight-ahead and turning power-off stalls resulted in a stable mush condition. Power-on stalls from 30 degrees nose up resulted in a +15 degree nose up stable mush, with no wing drop tendency. A near-vertical pitch resulted in a clean stall, with a smooth pitch forward and recovery to level flight with no wing drop tendency.

Spin testing entered from level flight, snap rolls and turning stalls failed to produce a spin condition as the WT-11 just mushed to level flight. These tests resulted in the company billing the aircraft as "Won't Spin".

Outside loops,  rolls, snap rolls, stall turns, tail slides and inverted flight were all completed as test procedures, although the company recommended against customers from conducting these manoeuvres.

Floats
The WT-11 was tested on fiberglass floats, mounted close to the fuselage.

Chinook 2S
Building on the success of the single-seat Chinook, Birdman introduced the two place Chinook 2S (2 seater) in 1984, and it quickly gained popularity as an ultralight trainer and also as a recreational aircraft. The 2S combined the WT-11's ease of handling, docile stall characteristics and spin-proofness with the reliable Rotax 447  and later the  Rotax 503  engine. One flight review writer noted, "The stall was the most benign that I have even seen in any airplane. At full back stick, it just mushes downward slowly with the nose level, at about 200-400 rpm. Releasing the stick returns the Chinook to flying with little altitude loss."

The fuel tank was relocated from the fuselage to both wing struts as aerodynamically-shaped plastic tanks, where they are visible in flight and the fuel level can be quickly determined. Some WT-11s have had these strut tanks installed as well.

In assessing the handling of the 2S, one reviewer wrote:

The two models of the Chinook built by Birdman were only in production for five years before the company went out of business in late 1987, but close to 700 aircraft were delivered in that time. The kits were made at the Canadian Ultralight Manufacturing facility in St Paul, Alberta.

Chinook Plus 2

One of the owners of a Chinook 2S at the time Birdman Enterprises went out of business was Brent Holomis. Seeing the opportunity to step in and provide parts for the fleet he founded Aircraft Sales and Parts (ASAP) in 1988, in Vernon, British Columbia. Initially ASAP concentrated on supplying parts, but with assistance from the University of Alberta, Holomis redesigned the aircraft. The new model, a two-seater introduced in 1989 was designated the Chinook Plus 2 and incorporated an all new wing of reduced span ( versus the 2S's ) and lower aspect ratio with a greater number of ribs and covered with Ceconite in place of untreated Dacron. The wing features flaperons. The new model has a completely new landing gear and many other improvements over the 2S and was built by Canadian Ultralight Manufacturing, which ASAP acquired. The Plus 2 retains the strut-mounted fuel tanks introduced on the 2S.

The Chinook Plus 2 is available in kit form with a large number of engine options, including the  Rotax 503, the four-stroke  HKS 700E, the  Rotax 582 and the  Rotax 912. The heavier engines, particularly the Rotax 912, have been noted as changing the aircraft's handling characteristics and making the aircraft less stable in pitch and yaw.

The aircraft has a very low power off sink rate of about 350 fpm (1.78 m/s).

Reviewer Dan Johnson, writing in EAA Sport Pilot & Light Sport Aircraft Magazine in January 2008, described the Chinook Plus 2 with the HKS 700E engine:

The factory claims that a first time builder can complete the Chinook Plus 2 in 220 hours of labour.

The rights to the Chinook Plus 2 were sold to a US company, the Aeroplane Manufactory in 2013, which put the design back into production in 2016.

Operational history
The Chinook WT-11 design won Reserve Grand Champion at AirVenture in 1983 and again in 1984.

In 1993, a  Rotax 582-powered Chinook Plus 2 on skis and Full Lotus Floats was used by the National Geographic Society in filming a television special about marine mammals in the Canadian Arctic.

Variants
Chinook WT-11-277
Single seat, powered by a  Rotax 277, produced by Birdman Enterprises 1983-1986.
Chinook WT-11-377
Single seat, powered by a  Rotax 377, produced by Birdman Enterprises 1984-1986.
Chinook 1S
Later designation for the WT-11, to align is nomenclature with the 2S. Single seat, powered by a  Rotax 277 or optionally a  Rotax 377, produced by Birdman Enterprises 1987.
Chinook 2S
Two seat, powered by a  Rotax 447 or  Rotax 503, produced by Birdman Enterprises 1984-1987.
Chinook Plus 2
Two seat, powered by a  Rotax 503,  HKS 700E,  Rotax 582 or  Rotax 912, produced by ASAP 1989-2013 and The Aeroplane Manufactory from 2016-present.

Specifications (Chinook WT-11)

See also

References

External links

1980s Canadian ultralight aircraft
Homebuilt aircraft
Single-engined pusher aircraft